George Alexander Reid (1794 – 12 May 1852) was a British Conservative politician.

Reid was elected Conservative Member of Parliament for Windsor at a by-election in 1845—caused by the death of John Ramsbottom—and held the seat until his own death in 1852.

References

External links
 

UK MPs 1841–1847
UK MPs 1847–1852
Conservative Party (UK) MPs for English constituencies
1794 births
1852 deaths